Christopher Cadden (born 19 September 1996) is a Scottish professional footballer who plays as a right-back for Scottish Premiership club Hibernian. Cadden, who is a product of the Motherwell Academy, made his first full international appearance for Scotland in May 2018.

Club career

Motherwell 
Cadden made his Motherwell debut as a substitute in a 4–1 win against Hearts on 1 March 2014. On 6 March 2015, Cadden joined Scottish League Two club Albion Rovers on loan until the end of the season. Cadden scored his first career goal on 4 April 2015, as Albion Rovers beat Berwick Rangers 2–0, and another in Albion Rovers' league-winning match against Clyde. His loan spell concluded with the club being promoted as divisional winners. On 30 January 2016, Cadden scored his first goal for Motherwell in a 2–2 draw away to Dundee. In March 2016, he signed a new contract with the club to run until the summer of 2018. By now establishing himself in the first team, he also contributed to Motherwell's Under-20s winning the Scottish Youth Cup for the first time. Cadden signed another contract with Motherwell in November 2016, extending its term by another year. He played in the finals of the 2017–18 League Cup and the 2017–18 Scottish Cup, both of which resulted in 2–0 defeats for Motherwell at the hands of Celtic.

Columbus Crew SC 
On 23 July 2019, free agent Cadden signed for Major League Soccer side Columbus Crew SC; it was announced that he would be immediately loaned to English club Oxford United and would join the Crew in advance of the 2020 season. Motherwell stated they would negotiate for a training compensation fee, due to no formal arrangement being in place with MLS in respect of clubs which had developed a young player receiving a payment when they left out of contract.

Loan to Oxford United 
Cadden made his Oxford debut in a 1–1 draw at Sunderland on the opening day of the 2019–20 season. During Cadden's loan spell, he made 21 appearances for Oxford and was widely considered one of the best right backs in EFL League One. Oxford manager Karl Robinson looked to make the loan permanent, but had its advances rejected by the Crew.

Return to Columbus 
Cadden started the 2020 season as depth at both the wing and wing-back positions, but was widely considered the successor to 33-year-old Ghanaian Harrison Afful. Cadden made his debut for the Crew against New York City FC in the first game of the season. He came on in the 87th minute for fellow debutante Lucas Zelarayán. In December 2020 he was part of the squad that won the MLS Cup. In January, it was reported that Cadden would likely leave the club in a bid to gain more playing time; it was noted that his transition to America was made difficult by the COVID-19 pandemic. Cadden was linked with a return to Great Britain with Hibernian, Aberdeen, and Oxford United.

Hibernian 
On 15 January 2021, Cadden returned home to Scotland, signing for Hibernian on a two-and-a-half year deal for an undisclosed fee.

International career
In August 2016, Cadden was named in the Scotland under-21 squad for the first time ahead of the European Under-21 Championship qualifiers against Macedonia and Ukraine, receiving the call having initially been left out the squad. He made his debut against Ukraine on 6 September 2016.

On 17 May 2018, Cadden was called up to the Scotland squad for the first time ahead of their friendlies against Peru and Mexico; he made his full Scotland debut on 29 May, in a 2–0 defeat to Peru.

Personal life
His twin brother, Nicky, is also a professional footballer playing for Barnsley FC in the EFL League One. The brothers attended Our Lady's High School, Motherwell, one year group ahead of fellow footballer Kieran Tierney. Their father Steve also won a lower division title with Albion Rovers and appeared in a Youth Cup final for Motherwell.

Career statistics

Club

International

Honours

Albion Rovers 

 Scottish League Two (1): 2014–15

Columbus Crew 

 MLS Cup (1): 2020

References

External links
 
 
 

Living people
1996 births
Scottish twins
Twin sportspeople
Scottish footballers
Footballers from Bellshill
People educated at Our Lady's High School, Motherwell
Association football fullbacks
Motherwell F.C. players
Albion Rovers F.C. players
Columbus Crew players
Oxford United F.C. players
Scottish Professional Football League players
Scotland under-21 international footballers
Scotland international footballers
Scottish expatriate footballers
Scottish expatriate sportspeople in the United States
Expatriate soccer players in the United States
Major League Soccer players
Hibernian F.C. players
English Football League players
Association football midfielders